Riḍván (Persian transliteration: Rezván) is a twelve-day festival in the Baháʼí Faith, commemorating Baháʼu'lláh's declaration that he was a Manifestation of God. In the Baháʼí calendar, it begins at sunset on the 13th of Jalál, which translates to the 20th or 21st of April, depending on the date of the March equinox (exactly one month on the Gregorian calendar after the equinox). On the first, ninth and twelfth days of Ridván, work and school should be suspended.

"Ridván" means paradise, and is named for the Garden of Ridván outside Baghdad, where Baháʼu'lláh stayed for twelve days after the Ottoman Empire exiled him from the city and before commencing his journey to Constantinople.

It is the holiest Baháʼí festival, and is also referred to as the "Most Great Festival" and the "King of Festivals".

History

Context
In 1844 Siyyid ʻAlí-Muhammad of Shiraz proclaimed that he was the "Báb", after a Shiʻa religious concept. His followers were therefore known as Bábís.  The Báb's writings introduced the concept of "He whom God shall make manifest", a Messianic figure whose coming, according to Baháʼís, was announced in the scriptures of all of the world's great religions.

Baháʼu'lláh claimed that his mission as the Promised One of the Báb, was revealed to Him in 1852 while imprisoned in the Síyáh-Chál in Tehran, Iran. After his release from the Síyáh-Chál, Baháʼu'lláh was banished from Persia, and he settled in Baghdad, which became the centre of Bábí activity.  Although he did not openly declare this prophetic mandate, he increasingly became the leader of the Bábí community.

Baháʼu'lláh's rising prominence in the city, and the revival of the Persian Bábí community, gained the attention of his enemies in Islamic clergy and the Persian government.  They were eventually successful in having the Ottoman government summon Baháʼu'lláh from Baghdad to Constantinople (present-day Istanbul).

Najibiyyih garden

Before Baháʼu'lláh left for Constantinople, many visitors came to visit him.  To allow his family to prepare for the trip, and to be able to receive all these visitors, he decided to move to the Najibiyyih garden across the Tigris river from Baghdad.  He entered the garden on 22 April 1863 (31 days after Naw Rúz, which usually occurs on 21 March) accompanied by his sons ʻAbdu'l-Bahá, Mírzá Mihdí and Mírzá Muhammad ʻAlí, his secretary Mirza Aqa Jan and some others, and stayed there for eleven days.

After his arrival in the garden, Baháʼu'lláh announced his mission and station for the first time to a small group of family and friends.  The exact nature and details of Baháʼu'lláh's declaration are unknown.  Bahíyyih Khánum is reported to have said that Baháʼu'lláh stated his claim to his son ʻAbdu'l-Bahá and four others.  While some Bábís had come to the realization that Baháʼu'lláh was claiming to be the Promised One through the many remarks and allusions that he had made during his final few months in Baghdad, it appears that most other Bábís were unaware of Baháʼu'lláh's claim until a few years later while he was in Edirne.

For the next eleven days Baháʼu'lláh received visitors including the governor of Baghdad.  Baháʼu'lláh's family was not able to join Him until 30 April, the ninth day, since the river had risen and made travel to the garden difficult though lasting only nine days was a comparatively mild flooding of the river. On the twelfth day of their stay in the garden, Baháʼu'lláh and his family left the garden and started on their journey to Constantinople.

Festival
In the Kitáb-i-Aqdas, written during 1873, Baháʼu'lláh ordains Ridván as one of two "Most Great Festivals", along with the Declaration of the Báb. He then specified the first, ninth, and twelfth days to be holy days; these days mark the days of Baháʼu'lláh's arrival, the arrival of his family and their departure from the Ridván garden, respectively.

The Festival of Ridván is observed according to the Baháʼí calendar, and begins on the thirty-second day of the Baháʼí year, which falls on 20 or 21 April.  The festival properly starts at two hours before sunset on that day, which symbolises the time that Baháʼu'lláh entered the garden. On the first, ninth, and twelfth days, which are Baháʼí Holy Days, work is prohibited. Currently, the three holy days are usually observed with a community gathering where prayers are shared, followed by a celebration.

Significance
The time that Baháʼu'lláh spent at the Garden of Ridván in April 1863, and the associated festival and celebration, has a very large significance for Baháʼís. Baháʼu'lláh calls it one of two "Most Great Festivals" and describes the first day as "the Day of supreme felicity" and he then describes the Garden of Ridvan as "the Spot from which He shed upon the whole of creation the splendours of his Name, the All-Merciful".

The festival is significant because of Baháʼu'lláh's private declaration to a few followers that he was "Him Whom God shall make manifest" and a Manifestation of God, and thus it forms the beginning point of the Baháʼí Faith, as distinct from the Babi religion.  It is also significant because Baháʼu'lláh left his house in Baghdad, which he designated the "Most Great House", to enter the Garden of Ridván. Baháʼu'lláh compares this move from the Most Great House to the Garden of Ridván to Muhammad's travel from Mecca to Medina.

Furthermore, during Baháʼu'lláh's first day in the garden, he made three further announcements: (1) abrogating religious war, which was permitted under certain conditions in Islam and the Bábí faith; (2) that there would not be another Manifestation of God for another 1,000 years; and (3) that all the names of God were fully manifest in all things. These statements appear in a text written some years after 1863, which has been included in the compilation Days of Remembrance (section 9). Nader Saiedi states that these three principles are "affirmed, expounded, and institutionalized" in Baháʼu'lláh's Kitab-i-Aqdas, which was completed in 1873.

Related texts
Throughout his life, Baháʼu'lláh wrote several tablets and prayers on the occasion of Ridván, among which are the following.

 Húr-i-ʻUjáb (Tablet of the Wondrous Maiden) 
 Lawh-i-ʻÁshiq va Maʻshúq (Tablet of the Lover and the Beloved)
 Súriy-i-Qalam (Súrih of the Pen)

These and several others are published in the volume titled Days of Remembrance

Baháʼí elections
The Ridván period is also the time when Baháʼí elections for the local and national Spiritual Assemblies take place every year, as well as the election of the Universal House of Justice, every five years.

Ridván messages
Annually, during Ridván, the Universal House of Justice sends a 'Ridván message' to the worldwide Baháʼí community, which generally looks back on the previous year, and provides further guidance for the coming year.

See also
Garden of Ridván, Akka

Notes and citations

Notes

Citations

References

Further reading
 Baháʼí World Centre (2017). Days of Remembrance – Selections from the Writings of Baháʼu'lláh for Baháʼí Holy Days.
 Related documents on Baháʼí Library Online

External links
A compendium on Ridván

Bahá'í holy days
April observances
May observances